The Gloucestershire Wassail, also known as "Wassail! Wassail! All Over the Town", "The Wassailing Bowl" and "Wassail Song" is an English Christmas carol from the county of Gloucestershire in England, dating back to at least the 18th century, but may be older.

The author of the lyrics and the composer of the music are unknown. The first known publication of the song's current version was in 1928 in the Oxford Book of Carols; however, earlier versions of the song had been published, including, but not limited to, publications in 1838, 1857, and 1868 by William Chappell, Robert Bell, and William Henry Husk respectively. Husk's 1868 publication contained a reference to it being sung by wassailers in the 1790s in Gloucestershire. "Gloucestershire Wassail" has a Roud Folk Song Index number of 209.

History
The song was sung in parts of England during the days of wassailing. This historical setting and the nature of its lyrics make it similar to carols such as Here We Come A-wassailing. The current most common version of the song was first published in 1928 in the Oxford Book of Carols by one of the book's three authors, Ralph Vaughan Williams. The tune was sung to him in August or July 1909 at the Swan Inn, an inn in Pembridge, Herefordshire, by an unknown old person from Gloucestershire.

Vaughan Williams published the tune and these lyrics in 1913. However, for the 1928 Oxford publication, he used different lyrics; the ones commonly sung today. These lyrics he largely got from renowned folk music revivalist Cecil J Sharp, as well as some from nineteenth century printed sources. Sharp's collection of lyrics were published in his 1916 book English Folk Songs, Collected and Arranged with Pianoforte Accompaniment by Cecil J Sharp. In the book, Sharp wrote:

The first six stanzas in the text are those that Mr. [William] Bayliss [of Buckland] gave me; they are printed without any alteration. The last three stanzas are from a variant sung to me by Mr. Isaac Bennett of Little Sodbury (Gloucestershire). The words are very similar to, but not identical with, those of "The Gloucestershire Wassailer's Song" quoted by [Robert] Bell (Ballads and Songs of the Peasantry of England, p. 183).

Through the years, there have been, and to a lesser extent still are, many different variations of the lyrics, chorus,  and number of stanzas sung, depending on historical time period, geographic location, arrangement, and individual circumstance. The underlying tune used for the lyrics has also altered considerably, depending on similar factors. However the currently used version of the tune is documented to have existed at least several hundred years ago. The sheet music from Husk's 1868 book, which contains the farthest-back reference of it being sung (to the 1790s), resembles today's, and in the oldest known sheet music publication, from an 1813 piece in England's Times Telescope, the tune resembles today's.

Gower Wassail appears to be a related wassailing song.

Recordings
The folklorist James Madison Carpenter made several audio recordings of the song in Gloucestershire in the early 1930s, which can be heard online via the Vaughan Williams Memorial Library website. Many other audio recordings were made of Gloucestershire residents singing wassailing songs in the second half of the twentieth century.

The American musical group Mannheim Steamroller did an instrumental cover of the song titled "Wassail, Wassail" on their popular 1984 album Christmas. American early music group Waverly Consort recorded and released the song on their 1994 album "A Waverly Consort Christmas".

Canadian folk/world music singer/composer Loreena McKennitt released the song on her 2008 Christmas album A Midwinter Night's Dream.

Canadian folk trio Trilogy (Eileen McGann, Cathy Miller, and David K.) included the song on the 1996 recording of their touring production, "2000 Years of Christmas".

Lyrics
Below are the ten present-day, most commonly heard stanzas of lyrics, as originally published in the Oxford Book of Carols. Note the first stanza is also the chorus. It is traditionally sung at the beginning of the song and after each stanza, or some variation thereof:

See also
 List of Christmas carols

Notes

References 

Christmas carols
British Christmas songs
Year of song unknown